Olney is an unincorporated community in Pickens County, Alabama, United States.

Education
Olney was home to a now defunct educational institution called the Senaka Academy.

References

Unincorporated communities in Alabama
Unincorporated communities in Pickens County, Alabama